Lombardo is an Italian demonym ("from Lombardy") and surname, most commonly found in Sicily where it is the third most common family name. Notable people with the name include:

Surname
Andrea Lombardo (born 1987), Canadian football (soccer) player
Ángel Lombardo (born 1983), Panamanian retired footballer
Antonio Lombardo (sculptor) (1458–1516), sculptor, son of Pietro Lombardo 
Antonio Lombardo (1892–1928), Italian-American advisor to Al Capone
Apolonio Lombardo (1934–2020), Panamanian footballer
Atilio Lombardo (1902-1984), Uruguayan botanist
Attilio Lombardo (born 1966), Italian football (soccer) player 
Carmen Lombardo (1903–1971), Canadian musician, brother of Guy Lombardo
Dave Lombardo (born 1965), Cuban-American drummer 
Giovanni Lombardo Radice (born 1954), Italian actor
Guy Lombardo (1902–1977), Canadian-American bandleader and musician 
Ivan Matteo Lombardo (1902–1980), Italian politician
Joe Lombardo (born 1962), former Sheriff of Clark County and Governor of Nevada since 2023
John Lombardo (born 1952), American musician (alternative rock band 10,000 Maniacs, folk duo John & Mary)
Joseph Lombardo (1929–2019), American Mafia figure
Juan Lombardo (1927–2019), Argentinean admiral, planned Operation Rosario
Lucio Lombardo-Radice (1916–1982), Italian mathematician
Manuel Lombardo (born 1998), Italian judoka
Marino Lombardo (1950–2021), Italian professional football player and coach
Massimo Lombardo (born 1973), Swiss footballer
Matteo Lombardo (born 1985) Italian footballer
Mauro Lombardo (born 1996) Argentinean rapper and singer
Michelle Lombardo (born 1983), American model and actress 
Philip Lombardo (1908-1987), American mobster
Pietro Lombardo (1435–1515), Italian sculptor 
Raffaele Lombardo (born 1950), Italian politician
Rick Lombardo (born 1959), American theatre director
Robert Lombardo (born 1932), American composer
Rosalia Lombardo (1918–1920), Italian girl and one of the last people placed in the catacombs of Palermo
Rossana Lombardo (born 1962), Italian sprinter
Stanley Lombardo (born 1943), American academic and translator
Tony Lombardo (contemporary), American punk musician
Tullio Lombardo (1460–1532), Italian  sculptor, son of Pietro Lombardo 
Vicente Lombardo Toledano (1894–1968), Mexican labor leader

Given name
Lombardo Boyar (born 1973), American actor

See also
Lombardo (family)
Lombardi (disambiguation)
Lombardia
Lombard (disambiguation)
Lombardozzi

References

Italian-language surnames
Toponymic surnames